is a passenger railway station situated in the city of Hamura, Tokyo, Japan, operated by the East Japan Railway Company (JR East).

Lines 
Ozaku Station is served by the Ōme Line, and is located 14.1 kilometers from the starting point of the line at Tachikawa Station.

Station layout 
This station consists of a two opposed ground-level side platforms serving two tracks, with an elevated station building above the tracks and then the platforms. The station is staffed.

Platforms

History
The station was first opened on 19 November 1894. With the privatization of Japanese National Railways (JNR) on 1 April 1987, the station came under the control of JR East. A new station building was completed in March 1993.

Passenger statistics
In fiscal 2019, the station was used by an average of 16,111 passengers daily (boarding passengers only).

The passenger figures for previous years are as shown below.

Surrounding area
Musashino Park

See also
 List of railway stations in Japan

References

External links

JR East station information 

Railway stations in Tokyo
Railway stations in Japan opened in 1894
Hamura, Tokyo
Ōme Line